In the Name of the King 2: Two Worlds (also known as In the Name of the King 2 and In the Name of the King: Two Worlds) is a 2011 fantasy adventure film directed by Uwe Boll. The film stars Dolph Lundgren, Natassia Malthe and Lochlyn Munro. It is the sequel to the 2007's In the Name of the King: A Dungeon Siege Tale starring Jason Statham. The film was released on DVD and Blu-ray in the United States and Canada on December 27, 2011.

Plot
Granger, a former Special Forces soldier living in modern-day Vancouver, is sent on a quest to fulfill an ancient prophecy. He is forcibly pulled into a time portal in his home after fighting off a small group of hooded assassins who try to kill him. He finds himself several hundred years in the past, in the forested war-torn Kingdom of Ehb. Granger teams up with an unlikely band of allies, accompanied by a female doctor named Manhattan.  His goal is to slay the leader of the "Dark Ones", a witch known only as the Holy Mother. Fighting against all odds, Granger must free the land from the grasp of the evil tyrant Raven, save the kingdom, and find a way to get back to his own time.

Cast
 Dolph Lundgren as Granger
 Lochlyn Munro as The King / Raven
 Natassia Malthe as Manhattan
 Christina Jastrzembska as Holy Mother
 Aleks Paunovic as Allard
 Natalia Guslistaya as Elianna 
 Elisabeth Rosen as Seer
 Michael Adamthwaite as Thane
 Michaela Mann as Young Woman
 Noah Beggs as Pudgy Dark One 
 Heather Doerksen as Dunyana

Sequel
A third film, In the Name of the King 3: The Last Mission, was released in 2014. The film stars Dominic Purcell; Boll returned to direct.

References

External links 
 
 

20th Century Fox films
2011 films
2011 direct-to-video films
2010s fantasy adventure films
American fantasy adventure films
American sword and sorcery films
Brightlight Pictures films
Canadian fantasy adventure films
Canadian sword and sorcery films
Direct-to-video sequel films
2010s English-language films
Films about time travel
Films based on role-playing video games
Films directed by Uwe Boll
Films set in British Columbia
Films shot in Vancouver
Live-action films based on video games
Works based on Microsoft video games
2010s American films
2010s Canadian films